Peyton Robert Siva Jr. (born October 24, 1990) is an American professional basketball player who last played for the Illawarra Hawks of the National Basketball League (NBL). He played college basketball for Louisville, leading the school to two Final Fours including a national championship his senior season. He was drafted by the Detroit Pistons, who selected him with the 56th overall pick in the 2013 NBA draft.

Early life and education
Siva is of Samoan descent and grew up in a troubled Seattle neighborhood. His mother worked three jobs to try to support the family. His father was mostly absent, struggling with drug and alcohol addiction throughout Siva's childhood. The younger Siva successfully talked his father out of killing himself.

Siva, determined to escape the fate of other family members, plunged himself into sports. When he first tried out for youth football, he was too light to play, but managed to make weight. He soon developed a reputation as a relentlessly aggressive athlete in both football and basketball, and as a promising young prospect. Siva also made it a point to avoid alcohol and drugs, and helped many other boys in his neighborhood avoid gang involvement, partially by persuading his mother to let them stay at her house on weekends.

High school career
Siva attended Franklin High School in Seattle. His freshman year he averaged 13.5 points helping Franklin win the 4A championship.  As a senior  he averaged 18.1 points, 5.3 assists, 3.4 rebounds, and 2.3 steals, leading Franklin to the Class 3A state championship.  He was a unanimous selection for AP Washington Player of the Year, was named a McDonald's All-American, and was named Mr. Basketball in the state of Washington.

High school awards and honors
2009 McDonald's All-American team selection
2009 Washington Mr. Basketball
2009 AP Washington boys high school Player of the Year
2009 Seattle Times boys high school Player of the Year
2009 Washington Class 3A State Champion
2009 Class 3A State Tournament MVP
2009 Metro League MVP
2009 Third-team Parade All-American

|}

College career

Freshman year
During his freshman season Siva averaged 11.3 minutes in 31 games backing up senior starter Edgar Sosa.  Hampered by a wrist injury throughout the year he managed to dish out at least 3 assists in 11 games and he scored a career high 14 at West Virginia. Louisville beat #1 Syracuse 78–68 in their final game of the final season at Freedom Hall, before moving to the KFC Yum! Center. The Cardinals finished the season 20–13, and tied for 5th in the Big East with an 11–7 conference record. They lost in the second round of the Big East tournament to Cincinnati 66–69. Louisville received an at-large bid to the 2010 NCAA tournament, earning a 9 seed in the South Region where they lost to 8 seed California 62–77 in the first round.

Sophomore year

In his sophomore season he started 35 games for the Cardinals, averaging 28 minutes a game. He averaged 9.9 points per game and his 5.2 assists per game ranked second best in the Big East. In consecutive games against West Virginia and Connecticut, Siva hit game-winning layups in the final seconds to give Louisville one-point victories. He was an honorable mention selection for the 2011 All-Big East Men's Basketball Team and was named to the 2011 Big East men's basketball tournament All-Tournament Team after averaging 12 points, 7.7 assists, and 5.3 rebounds as the Cardinals reached the championship game. The Cardinals finished the season 25–10, 12–6 in the 2010–11 Big East season tied for 3rd in the conference. They received an at-large bid and a #4 seed in the 2011 NCAA tournament where they were upset in the second round by #13 seeded Morehead State 61–62.

Junior year
During his junior year in 2011–12, Siva had difficulties on the court early in the season; midway through the season, he had made less than 25% of his three-point attempts, and turned the ball over as much as four times in one half. Cardinals coach Rick Pitino sensed that Siva was getting involved in too many things, and pulled him aside for a talk. Pitino later recalled, "I told him, 'Take a relationship sabbatical — I'll even call your girlfriend for you.' He should only be making time for two things: school and basketball. I told him that we need 100 percent of his focus on the court." From that point, Siva rediscovered his game, and became the Most Outstanding Player of the 2012 Big East tournament. In the tournament he averaged 13.8 points and 5.8 assists per game. Louisville advanced to the Final Four of the 2012 NCAA tournament, upsetting #1 seed Michigan State 57–44 in the sweet sixteen and defeating #7 seed Florida in the regional final. Before losing in the national semifinals to arch-rival and eventual national champion Kentucky. Siva averaged 9.1 points, 3.2 rebounds, 5.6 assists, and 1.7	steals a game for the Cardinals, who finished the season with a 30–10 record.

Senior year

Before the start of the 2012–13 basketball season the Louisville Cardinals men's basketball team was picked to finish 1st in the Big East Conference in polls done by Big East writers  and coaches. Siva was selected as the Big East Preseason Player of the Year and to the Big East Preseason first team by both the writers and coaches also. U of L finished the regular season with a 26–5 record and 14–4 in the Big East to tie for a share of the Big East regular season championship with Georgetown and Marquette, who also finished with a 14–4 conference record.  Siva led Louisville to the 2013 Big East tournament championship and was named the tournament's most outstanding player for the second consecutive year. Siva became the second player ever to win this award multiple times; Patrick Ewing accomplished the same feat in 1984 and 1985 Siva had a Big East tournament and school record for steals in a Big East tournament game with seven vs Notre Dame in the semi-finals, it tied Terrence Williams (also from Seattle, WA) the only other Louisville player and 10 others. The seven steals made him Louisville's all-time career leader with 236 steals, at that time, he passed Darrell Griffith's record of 230 he had from 1976–80. Louisville, with a 35–5 record, was selected the #1 overall seed for the 2013 NCAA tournament. Siva was a 2012–13 Academic All-America selection. and was a 2012–13 Senior CLASS Award finalist. Finally, he was named the recipient of the men's Frances Pomeroy Naismith Award, given by the Naismith Memorial Basketball Hall of Fame to the top NCAA Division I senior no taller than 6'0" (1.83 m). Louisville would go on to beat Michigan and win the 2013 NCAA men's basketball championship.

College awards and honors
2011 All-Big East Honorable Mention Selection
2011 Big East All-Tournament team
2012 NCAA West Regional all-tournament team selection
2012 Big East tournament MVP
2013 Big East tournament MVP
2013 NCAA National champion
2013 Frances Pomeroy Naismith Award
2013 American Eagle Outfitters Big East Men's Basketball Scholar-Athlete of the Year
2013 Academic All-American
2013 All-Big East Third Team

Professional career

Detroit Pistons (2013–2014)
Siva was drafted 56th overall in the 2013 NBA draft by the Detroit Pistons. In July 2013, he joined the Pistons for the 2013 NBA Summer League. On August 5, 2013, he signed with the Pistons. On December 26, 2013, he was assigned to the Fort Wayne Mad Ants. On January 13, 2014, he was recalled by the Pistons. On January 31, 2014, he was reassigned to the Mad Ants. He was recalled in mid-February 2014.

On July 15, 2014, he was waived by the Pistons following the 2014 NBA Summer League.

Orlando Magic (2014)
On September 29, 2014, Siva signed with the Orlando Magic. However, he was later waived by the Magic on October 25, 2014. On October 30, 2014, Siva was acquired by the Erie BayHawks as an affiliate player.

Juvecaserta Basket (2015–2016)
On August 12, 2015, Siva signed with Juvecaserta Basket of the Italian Serie A for the 2015–16 season. Siva led the Serie A in assists, as he had 6.5 per game.

Alba Berlin (2016–2021)
On June 22, 2016, Siva signed a two-year deal with Alba Berlin. For Berlin, Siva has been the starting point guard and has guided the team to two BBL championships, in 2020 and 2021. In 2018, he was named to the All-BBL First Team.

New Zealand Breakers (2021–2022)
On August 22, 2021, Siva signed with the New Zealand Breakers for the 2021–22 NBL season. He suffered a grade 2 hamstring tear in the second game of the season was ruled out for up to eight weeks. He returned to action on January 9, 2022.

Panathinaikos (2022)
On April 28, 2022, Siva signed with Panathinaikos of the Greek Basket League for the rest of the 2021–22 season. In 12 league games, he averaged 2.9 points, 2.4 rebounds and 3.2 assists, playing around 17 minutes per contest.

Illawarra Hawks (2022–2023)
On October 19, 2022, Siva signed with the Illawarra Hawks for the rest of the 2022–23 NBL season. On January 5, 2023, he was ruled out for the rest of the season after suffering a right shoulder injury. He sustained a high-grade AC joint injury in the Hawks' New Years Eve game against the Perth Wildcats.

NBA career statistics

Regular season

|-
| align="left" | 
| align="left" | Detroit
| 24 || 0 || 9.3 || .316 || .280 || .733 || .6 || 1.4 || .4 || .0 || 2.3
|-
| colspan=2 align="center" | Career
| 24 || 0 || 9.3 || .316 || .280 || .733 || .6 || 1.4 || .4 || .0 || 2.3

Personal life
Siva is a devout Christian and is involved with Louisville's Fellowship of Christian Athletes. After Siva successfully talked his father out of suicide, the two have become close, according to the younger Siva. His father gave up other drugs shortly after the suicide attempt; while he has continued to struggle with alcohol, family members say his condition has steadily improved. Every year during his son's college career, his father came to Louisville to spend the season with his son, and was a fixture at Cardinals home games. His siblings have also abandoned their previous criminal activity, and his mother, who had worked three jobs while he was growing up, is now a drug counselor. Siva was one of the top searched college basketball players in his final season at Louisville.

Shortly after his graduation, he married his longtime girlfriend, Patience McCroskey, on July 27, 2013 at Louisville's home arena, the KFC Yum! Center, in a large reception room that overlooks the Ohio River. The wedding was the first to be held at the arena.

References

External links
Louisville Cardinals bio
ESPN.com Profile
FIBA.com Profile

1990 births
Living people
Alba Berlin players
American expatriate basketball people in Australia
American expatriate basketball people in Germany
American expatriate basketball people in Greece
American expatriate basketball people in Italy
American expatriate basketball people in New Zealand
American men's basketball players
American sportspeople of Samoan descent
Basketball players from Seattle
Christians from Washington (state)
Detroit Pistons draft picks
Detroit Pistons players
Erie BayHawks (2008–2017) players
Fort Wayne Mad Ants players
Franklin High School (Seattle) alumni
Illawarra Hawks players
Juvecaserta Basket players
Louisville Cardinals men's basketball players
McDonald's High School All-Americans
New Zealand Breakers players
Panathinaikos B.C. players
Parade High School All-Americans (boys' basketball)
Point guards